Depper is a surname, being a variant of the surname Dipper. Notable people with the surname include:

Dave Depper, American musician and multi-instrumentalist
Martin Depper (born 1968), British auto racing driver and businessman